"There's a Party Goin' On" is a single by American country music artist Jody Miller. Released in May 1972, it was the third single from her album There's a Party Goin' On. The song peaked at number 4 on the Billboard Hot Country Singles chart. It also reached number 1 on the RPM Country Tracks chart in Canada.

Chart performance

Cover Versions
Nancy Sinatra covered the song, which was included on her 1972 album, Woman, as would Lynn Anderson on her 1972 album Listen to a Country Song.

References

 
1972 singles
Jody Miller songs
Songs written by Billy Sherrill
Songs written by Glenn Sutton
1972 songs